HMS Alcmene was a 32-gun  fifth rate of the Royal Navy. This frigate served during the French Revolutionary and Napoleonic Wars under the command of several notable officers. Alcmene was active in several theatres of the war, spending most of her time cruising in search of enemy vessels or privateers, and escorting convoys. She fought at the Battle of Copenhagen in 1801 and served in the blockade of the French coasts during the later Napoleonic Wars until she was wrecked on the French coast in 1809.

Construction and commissioning
Alcmene was ordered from the yards of Joseph Graham, of Harwich on 14 February 1793, shortly after the outbreak of the French Revolutionary Wars. She was laid down there in April that year and launched on 8 November 1794. The ship was completed at Chatham Dockyard by 12 April 1795 and had commissioned under her first commander, Captain William Brown, in January that year. Joining the Alcmene on 26 March was surgeon William Beatty, who later served aboard  at the Battle of Trafalgar, and attended the dying Lord Nelson. Beatty would spend most of the next five years aboard Alcmene, his longest period on a single ship.

Career
Alcmene went out as a convoy escort to the West Indies in November 1795, returning in January the following year and serving on the Lisbon station from August. Alcmenes main tasks involved escorting convoys to and from Oporto and Lisbon, some numbering upwards of 200 merchants; and cruising off the coast in search of enemy warships and privateers.

Alcmene took the 14-gun privateer Rochelleuse off Cape Finisterre on 6 March 1797, while the privateers Bonaparte and Légère were taken on 8 January and 22 August 1798 respectively. Alcmene had been refitting at Spithead when the naval mutiny broke out there. Her crew did not join the mutineers, though there were rumblings of mutiny later in the year aboard her, and several seaman were tried and punished. Captain George Johnstone Hope took command in August 1798 and Alcmene went out to the Mediterranean. She took part in the Mediterranean campaign of 1798, carrying supplies to the British fleet, and raided enemy shipping.

Hope tried to board her before her captain could throw overboard any dispatches she was carrying for Napoleon Bonaparte, then in Egypt. Hope was unsuccessful, but two seamen from Alcmenes crew jumped overboard and were able to retrieve the dispatches before they sank. One of Alcemenes boats was able to rescue the intrepid seamen. The Royal Navy took the gunboat into service as HMS Legere.

In 1799, Alcmene helped Horatio Nelson to evacuate the Neapolitan Royal family from Naples ahead of the advancing French armies. She then returned to the Lisbon station.

Alcmene captured the privateer  on 26 June 1799. Courageaux, though pierced for 32 guns, only had twenty-eight 12 and 9-pounders, some of which she had thrown overboard while Alcmene chased her. Courageaux had a crew of 253 men under the command Jean Bernard. No casualties were reported for either side. On 1 August, Alcmene captured Deux Amis.

Capture of Thetis and Santa Brigada

On 15 October 1799,  sighted two Spanish frigates. She gave chase and before dawn  joined the pursuit. By 11:30 am, Ethalion had caught up with her quarry and after a short engagement the Spanish vessel struck her colours.

Triton, the fastest of the three British frigates, led the chase. The next morning she struck some rocks as she tried to prevent her quarry from reaching port. Triton got off the rocks and resumed the chase despite taking on water. She and Alcmene then exchanged fire with the Spanish frigate, which surrendered before Naiad could catch up. Four large Spanish ships came out from Vigo but then retreated when the three British frigates made ready to receive them. Alcmene had one man killed and nine wounded, and Triton had one man wounded;  had two men killed and eight men wounded.

The vessel that Ethalion captured turned out to be Thetis, under the command of Captain Don Juan de Mendoza. She was homeward-bound from Vera Cruz (Mexico) with a cargo of cocoa, cochineal, and sugar, and more importantly, specie worth 1,385,292 Spanish dollars (£312,000). The vessel that Triton, Alcmene and Naiad captured was Santa Brigada, under the command of Captain Don Antonio Pillon. She was carrying drugs, annatto, cochineal, indigo, sugar, and some 1,500,000 dollars. Prize money was paid on 14 January 1800.

Alcmene then returned to Plymouth in November 1799.

Hope's successor, in 1799, was Captain Henry Digby, and Alcmene joined the squadron blockading the French coast. Captain Samuel Sutton took command in January 1801, and she went at first to Lisbon and then to the Baltic with Sir Hyde Parker's expeditionary force in March 1801. She was present at the Battle of Copenhagen on 2 April that year, as part of Edward Riou's frigate squadron, and suffered five men killed and 19 wounded in the battle. In 1847, The Admiralty authorized the issuance of the Naval General Service Medal with the clasp "Copenhagen 1801" to any remaining survivors of the battle.

Sutton was killed by a sniper's bullet during the battle. Alcmene then came under the command of Captain Edmund Carlise who was promoted in action from lieutenant, appointed substantively wef 17 July and remaining captain of Alcmene in the Baltic and Newfoundland until 2 July 1802, according to a transcription of Admiralty Officers' Services, Captains, Vol 1 Folio 7 given to one of his descendants.

Alcmene went out as a convoy escort to Newfoundland, before returning to British waters and joining the Channel Fleet. Captain John Stiles took command in August 1802, and Alcmene spent between 1804 and 1805 on the Channel Islands station. 

In February 1804 Alcmene recaptured Bee of Kingsbridge, and Egyptian of Warterford and took them into Guernsey.

Captain James Brisbane succeeded Stiles in November 1805 and sailed Alcmene to the Irish station.

Here she took the privateer Courier on 4 January 1806. Courier was the former His Majesty's hired armed cutter . Courier was pierced for 14 guns but mounted only seven brass 42 and 24-pounder carronades. She had a crew of 70 men, was four days out of Morlaix, and had not captured any prizes.

Alcmene came under her last commander, Captain William Tremlett, in January 1808. Tremlett commanded her in the English Channel.

Fate
Alcmene was wrecked at the mouth of the Loire on 29 April 1809. She was following the 44-gun frigate  to reconnoiter the French forces when her pilot's ignorance resulted in her striking Blanche Rock, off Nantes. The ebbing tide made it impossible to get her off and at low tide she broke her back and bilged. Fortunately, Amelia was able to rescue both the entire crew of Alcmene and her stores. Her crew then set fire to Alcmene. She burnt to the waterline, leaving little of use to the French.

Notes, citations, and references

Notes

Citations

References

 
 
 
 
 Winfield, Rif & Stephen S Roberts (2015) French Warships in the Age of Sail 1786 - 1861: Design Construction, Careers and Fates. (Seaforth Publishing).

External links
 

 

Frigates of the Royal Navy
Ships built in Harwich
1794 ships
Shipwrecks in the Bay of Biscay
Maritime incidents in 1809